Hutt Park railway station may refer to:
 Hutt Park railway station, Gracefield, a closed railway station on the Gracefield Branch line in New Zealand
 Hutt Park railway station, Petone, a closed railway station on the Hutt Park Railway in New Zealand